Terry Pettus Park is a  park located in Seattle, Washington, on the eastern shoreline of Lake Union at Fairview Avenue E. and E. Newton Street. It includes shoreline access and a public float.

The park is named after Terry Pettus, an activist who played a crucial role in saving Lake Union's houseboats.

Notes

External links

Terry Pettus Park, Seattle Parks and Recreation
Historylink essay on Terry Pettus

Parks in Seattle